The Cabinet of Kuwait is the chief executive body of the State of Kuwait. The following cabinet is the 36th in the history of Kuwait. It was formed on 17 December 2019, after the previous Cabinet resigned on 14 November 2019. On 30 January 2020, Minister Ghadeer Al-Aseeri tendered her resignation. On 16 February 2020, a cabinet reshuffle took place and Kuwait's Amir received new cabinet members for oath ceremony. On 2 March 2020, Minister Mohammad Bushehri's resignation as Minister of Electricity & Water was accepted. On 26 October 2020, Minister Mohammad Al-Jabri's resignation as Minister of Information and Minister of State for Youth Affairs was accepted. On 6 December 2020, the resignation of the Prime Minister and all the ministers were accepted by the Emir of Kuwait. The cabinet will be proceeding in a care taking manner until the formation of the new cabinet.

Official Amiri Decree published in Official Gazette/Kuwait Digest

See also
Cabinet of Kuwait
35th Cabinet of Kuwait
37th Cabinet of Kuwait

References

External links
Current Ministerial Formation (Council of Ministers General Secretariat)
Official English names of Kuwaiti ministers and ministries (Kuwaiti Government)
The Official Gazette - Kuwait Al Yawm (Kuwait Digest - Ministry of Information)

Kuwait
Government of Kuwait